Patrick Murray (6 May 1874 – 25 December 1925) was a Scottish footballer who played for Hibernian and Scotland.

References

Sources

External links

London Hearts profile (Scotland)
London Hearts profile (Scottish League)

1874 births
1925 deaths
Association football outside forwards
Scottish footballers
Scotland international footballers
Hibernian F.C. players
Scottish Football League players
Scottish Football League representative players
People from Lennoxtown
Sportspeople from East Dunbartonshire